Elizabeth Haynes may refer to:

 Elizabeth Haynes (crime writer), British writer of crime fiction
 Elizabeth Ross Haynes (1883–1953), African American social worker, sociologist and author
 Elizabeth Sterling Haynes (1897–1957), Alberta theatre activist